The 2019 Southern Illinois Salukis football team represented Southern Illinois University Carbondale as a member of the Missouri Valley Football Conference (MVFC) during the 2019 NCAA Division I FCS football season. Led by fourth-year head coach Nick Hill, the Salukis compiled an overall record of 7–5 with a mark of 5–3 in conference play, placing in a three-way tie for third in the MVFC. Southern Illinois played home games at Saluki Stadium in Carbondale, Illinois.

Preseason

MVFC poll
In the MVFC preseason poll released on July 29, 2019, the Salukis were predicted to finish in ninth place.

Preseason All–MVFC team
The Salukis had four players selected to the preseason all-MVFC team.

Offense

D.J. Davis – RB

Defense

Anthony Knighton – DL

Jeremy Chinn – DB

Je'Quan Burton – RS

Schedule

Game summaries

at Southeast Missouri State

at UMass

UT Martin

at Arkansas State

at South Dakota State

Illinois State

Youngstown State

at South Dakota

at Indiana State

Missouri State

at Western Illinois

North Dakota State

Players drafted into the NFL

References

Southern Illinois
Southern Illinois Salukis football seasons
Southern Illinois Salukis football